Black Siren may refer to:

 Black Siren, a member of the Justice Guild of America
 Black Siren (Arrowverse), the alias of Earth-2's Laurel Lance in the Arrowverse
 The Black Siren, a 1947 Spanish film